Symphyotrichum cordifolium (formerly Aster cordifolius), commonly known as common blue wood aster, heartleaf aster, and blue wood-aster, is a perennial herbaceous flowering plant in the family Asteraceae native to central and eastern North America.

Description
The lower leaves are heart-shaped, while leaves higher on the stem tend to be sessile with more rounded bases. The composite flowers, which have bluish to rarely white ray florets and light yellow disc florets that eventually turn purple, emerge in August and persist into October.

Chromosomes
S. cordifolium has a chromosome base number of x = 8. Diploid and tetraploid cytotypes with respective counts of 16 and 32 have been reported.

Taxonomy
Symphyotrichum cordifolium is classified in the subgenus Symphyotrichum, section Symphyotrichum. The species was first formally described by Carl Linnaeus in 1753 as Aster cordifolius.

Hybrids
Where the range of Symphyotrichum cordifolium overlaps with that of S. puniceum, the F1 hybrid named Symphyotrichum × tardiflorum can occur. Symphyotrichum × schistosum is the hybrid of S. cordifolium and S. laeve var. laeve.

A hybrid of S. cordifolium and S. shortii may occur, and this has been named Symphyotrichum × finkii. Hybrids with S. drummondii and S. urophyllum have been reported but not confirmed.

Distribution and habitat
Symphyotrichum cordifolium occurs from Manitoba, east to Nova Scotia and Maine, south to Georgia and Alabama, and west to Oklahoma. It was once introduced in British Columbia but did not persist. It is an introduced species in Great Britain and Norway.

It can be found on open wooded slopes, along the banks of streams, on moist ledges, in swampy woods, along the borders of beech–maple forests and oak–hickory forests, as well as in clearings, thickets, and along roadsides and ditches. It also can be found in urban areas where it is sometimes considered a weed species.

Ecology

Reproduction
Symphyotrichum cordifolium reproduces vegetatively via short rhizomes, as well as via wind-dispersed seeds. The ray florets of species in the Symphyotrichum genus are exclusively female, each having a pistil but no stamen, while disk florets are bisexual, each with both male and female reproductive parts.

Pests and diseases

Two rusts have been recorded on S. cordifolium: the brown rust Puccinia dioicae and the red rust Coleosporium asterum.

Conservation
Symphyotrichum cordifolium has coefficients of conservatism (C-values) in the Floristic Quality Assessment (FQA) that range from  depending on evaluation region. The lower the C-value, the higher tolerance the species has for disturbance and the lesser the likelihood that it is growing in a presettlement natural community. In the Dakotas, for example, S. cordifolium has a C-value of 8, meaning its populations there are found in high-quality remnant natural areas with little environmental degradation but can tolerate some periodic disturbance. In contrast, in the Laurentian plains and hills of Maine and New Brunswick, it has been given a C-value of 2, meaning its presence in locations of that ecoregion provides little confidence of a remnant habitat.

, NatureServe listed Symphyotrichum cordifolium as Secure (G5) worldwide, Critically Imperiled (S1) in Kansas, and Vulnerable (S3) in Delaware and Missouri.

Uses

Medicinal
The Ojibwe have used S. cordifolium to make an incense to attract deer.

Gardening
Symphyotrichum cordifolium is cultivated as a garden plant under its current name and the older name Aster cordifolius. Several cultivars have been selected for garden use, and the following have achieved the Royal Horticultural Society's Award of Garden Merit: 

'Chieftain' has "light mauve-blue ray florets."
'Little Carlow' (S. cordifolium hybrid) with "abundant violet-blue" rays.
‘Photograph’ (S. cordifolium hybrid) has "pale lilac-blue flowers."
'Sweet Lavender' with "lavender-blue flowers."

Citations

References

cordifolium
Flora of Canada
Flora of the United States
Plants used in traditional Native American medicine
Plants described in 1753
Taxa named by Carl Linnaeus